John T. Rose (April 22, 1934 – July 19, 1988) was an American state representative and former teacher from Minnesota. Prior to entering politics, Rose taught at Emmet D. Williams Elementary school and St. Rose of Lima Catholic School in Roseville as a physical education teacher.

Political career
Rose was elected to the Minnesota House of Representatives in 1976 as an Independent-Republican, and was re-elected for five more consecutive terms. He served on committees related to natural resources, energy, and education. He was a member of the House of Representatives from 1977 until 1988.

Personal life and education
Rose attended Mankato State Teachers College where he earned both a Bachelor of Science and a Master of Science in education. He later married his wife Marilyn and had four children, Kathy, Julie, Dan, and Keith. Rose was an avid hunter and outdoorsman, who owned 160 acres of hunting and farm land in rural Minnesota.

He died while serving his sixth term on July 19, 1988 from complications following an intestinal surgery at St. John's Northeast Hospital in Maplewood, Minnesota. His death was met with shock and sadness from the majority of his colleagues and fellow politicians.

Legacy
The Guidant John Rose Minnesota Oval in Roseville, Minnesota is named after him for his work in politics as well as his support of youth sports in Roseville.

External links

Profile at Minnesota Legislature
Obituary

1934 births
1988 deaths
20th-century American politicians
Educators from Minnesota
Farmers from Minnesota
Republican Party members of the Minnesota House of Representatives
Military personnel from Minnesota
Minnesota State University, Mankato alumni
People from Roseville, Minnesota
Politicians from Mankato, Minnesota